"Jerusalem" is a song by British singer and songwriter Belouis Some, released in 1986 as the fourth and final single from his debut studio album Some People. It was written by Belouis Some, and produced by Pete Schwier, Steve Thompson, Michael Barbiero and Belouis Some. "Jerusalem" reached No. 98 in the UK and remained in the charts for one week.

Background
In a 1984 interview with Debut, Belouis Some described the song's lyrics as "really heavy". He stated, "Songs like 'Jerusalem' are really heavy (lyrically that is). 'Jerusalem' is a bit depressing, it's just me trying to be clever, but I'm not trying to get any message across."

Release
For its release as a single, "Jerusalem" was remixed by Thompson and Barbiero in May 1986. In addition to the standard 7-inch and 12-inch releases, a limited 7-inch gatefold sleeve double pack version was also issued. The bonus vinyl features "Round and Round" (from the Pretty in Pink soundtrack) as the A-side and "Stand Down" (from Some People) as the B-side.

Critical reception
On its release as a single, Lola Borg of Smash Hits wrote, "It's smooth 'n' moody, a tinge on the pretentious side and sounds as though he's recruited David Bowie on vocals and Sooty on xylophone. And as for the lyrics - what on earth is he going on about?" Dave Ling of Number One stated, "'Jerusalem' sees a drop in pace after his last couple of re-releases. Unfortunately this strategy blows up in his face as this rather laboured song just forces home how average a vocalist our Nev really is."

Roger Morton of Record Mirror commented, "Mr Some has tried for a big pop song here. One of those epic musclebound ballads, awash with splendid synthesised atmospherics. As an idea, it's wonderful. As a record, it plods." John Lee of the Huddersfield Daily Examiner felt "Jerusalem" was Belouis Some's "weakest single so far" and added, "If a place in the upper echelons of pop's rather select hierarchy is what's desired, then he'll have to pull his finger out." 

In a review of Some People, Voice of Youth Advocates said: "...on tracks such as the elaborate 'Jerusalem,' he seems to reveal his true affinity, a highly textured art rock". Lisa Clark of Smash Hits described the song as "haunting" and "David Bowie-inspired". David Marx of Debut described the song as "haunting" and "inevitable but fascinating".

Track listing
7-inch single
"Jerusalem" - 5:47
"Target Practice" - 4:36

Double-pack 7-inch single
"Jerusalem" - 5:47
"Target Practice" - 4:36
"Round and Round" - 4:09
"Stand Down" - 3:11

12-inch single
"Jerusalem (Long Version)" - 5:39
"Jerusalem (Instrumental Version)" - 5:54
"Target Practice (Dance Mix)" - 6:01

Personnel
Production
 Belouis Some - producer of "Jerusalem" and "Round and Round"
 Pete Schwier - producer of "Jerusalem" and "Stand Down"
 Steve Thompson, Michael Barbiero - producers of "Jerusalem" and "Target Practice", remixing on "Jerusalem" and "Stand Down"
 Jason Carsaro - remixing on "Target Practice"
 Bernard Edwards, Walter Samuel - producers of "Round and Round"
 Ian Little - producer of "Stand Down"

Other
 Accident - sleeve design
 Eric Watson - photography

Charts

References

1985 songs
1986 singles
Belouis Some songs
Parlophone singles
Songs written by Belouis Some